Zadonbeh-ye Pain (also Romanized as Zādonbeh-ye Pā’īn; also known as Zādan Beg Pāīn and Zādonbeh) is a village in Barakuh Rural District, Jolgeh-e Mazhan District, Khusf County, South Khorasan Province, Iran. At the 2006 census, its population was 9, in 4 families.

References 

Populated places in Khusf County